The Exhibition railway line is a special-purpose railway line in Brisbane, the state capital of Queensland, Australia. It conveys Queensland Rail City network passengers during the Royal Queensland Show (locally known as "the Ekka") in August and rare other special events held in the showgrounds. It is informally known as the Ekka Loop.

Goods trains also use the Exhibition line to access the Normanby marshalling yard and to travel across Brisbane while avoiding city stations and congestion between Bowen Hills and Roma Street stations.  QR Traveltrain long-distance passenger services similarly use the Exhibition line to arrive at and depart from Roma Street station.  Empty City network and Traveltrain sets also use the line to access the Normanby train washing facility and the Mayne locomotive and electric depot.

History
When the Roma St to Sandgate railway opened in 1882, it had been constructed via Normanby to avoid the need for land resumptions through the Brisbane CBD. When passenger trains were diverted to the new line via Central station in 1890, traffic diminished significantly, and the section between Exhibition station and Mayne along with Normanby station was closed in 1900.

Traffic on the QR system continued to grow, and so the closed section was reopened in 1911 to allow goods trains from the North Coast line to use that route to reach Roma St, the main goods yard in Brisbane. When the locomotive and carriage sheds were relocated from Roma St to Mayne in 1927, the line was duplicated to deal with the additional empty trains travelling to and from Brisbane's main terminating station.

The line was electrified in 1982 to allow empty electric units to travel to and from Roma St.

Line guide and services
Services stop at city stations (Roma Street, Central and Fortitude Valley) before the loop leaves the main line in the middle of platform 4 of Bowen Hills, and therefore can not stop here for passengers.  The service runs in both directions.

Passengers for/from the Airport, Doomben, Caboolture, Ferny Grove,  Nambour and Gympie North and Shorncliffe lines change at Central or Fortitude Valley) and Beenleigh, Cleveland, Gold Coast, Ipswich and Rosewood, lines at Roma Street.

References

External links
Queensland Rail
TransLink

Railway loop lines
Public transport in Brisbane
Brisbane railway lines
3 ft 6 in gauge railways in Australia